Émilie Loit and Åsa Carlsson were the defending champions, but Loit did not compete this year. Carlsson teamed up with Silvia Farina Elia and lost in the semifinals to Yayuk Basuki and Caroline Vis.

Basuki and Vis won the title by defeating Tina Križan and Katarina Srebotnik 6–3, 6–3 in the final.

Seeds

Draw

Draw

References

External links
 Official results archive (ITF)
 Official results archive (WTA)

Doubles
Volvo Women's Open - Doubles
 in women's tennis